Ernest Näf (born 2 May 1920) was a Swiss racing cyclist. He was the Swiss National Road Race champion in 1944.

References

External links
 

1920 births
Possibly living people
Swiss male cyclists
People from Stäfa
Sportspeople from the canton of Zürich